Hypocoelotes is a genus of East Asian funnel weavers containing the single species, Hypocoelotes tumidivulva. It was  first described by Y. Nishikawa in 2009, and has only been found in Japan.

References

External links

Agelenidae
Monotypic Araneomorphae genera